Bacculometry is the art of measuring accessible or inaccessible distances, or lines, by the help of one or more staves or rods. Daniel Schwenter has explained this art in his Geometria Practica (1627); and the rules of it are delivered by Wolfius, in his Elements. Jacques Ozanam also gives an illustration of the principles of baculometry.

References
 
Charles Hutton. Mathematical and Philosophical Dictionary, 1795.

Measurement